Jeff Perren is a game designer, a hobby shop owner, and an early associate of Gary Gygax.

Career
Jeff Perren was an early member of the Lake Geneva Tactical Studies Association along with  Gary Gygax, Terry and Rob Kuntz, Ernie Gygax, Mike Reese, Leon Tucker, and Don Kaye. Perren developed his own rules for Siege of Bodenburg, and shared them with Gary Gygax. Early in 1970, the LGTSA purchased a considerable number of Elastolin figures, which motivated Perren to develop four pages of his own rules for these miniatures which focused on mass combat. Perren and Gygax created this set of medieval miniatures rules and called it Chainmail, publishing the first set of these rules in a fanzine for the Castle & Crusade Society known as The Domesday Book. Perren and Gygax also designed the miniatures game Cavaliers and Roundheads (1973), which would be the first game published by Gygax's new company TSR.

References

American game designers
Living people
Place of birth missing (living people)
Year of birth missing (living people)